10,000 Black Men Named George is a 2002 Showtime TV movie about A. Philip Randolph and his coworkers Milton Webster and Ashley Totten. The title refers to the custom of the time when Pullman porters, all of whom were black, were addressed as "George".

Plot
The film follows union activist A. Philip Randolph's efforts to organize the black porters of the Pullman Rail Company in 1920s America, known as the Brotherhood of Sleeping Car Porters.

Cast
 Andre Braugher as A. Philip Randolph
 Charles S. Dutton as Milton P. Webster
 Mario Van Peebles as Ashley Totten
 Brock Peters as Leon Frey
 Carla Brothers as Lucille Randolph
 Kenneth McGregor as Barton Davis
 Ellen Holly as Selena Frey
 Ernestine Jackson as Mrs. Randolph
 Ardon Bess as Morris "Daddy" Moore

Production
The movie was filmed in Toronto, Ontario, Canada.

Awards and nominations
The film was nominated for multiple awards, including the NAACP Image Award for Outstanding Television Movie, Mini-Series or Dramatic Special. Charles S. Dutton won the NAACP Image Award for Outstanding Actor in a Television Movie, Mini-Series or Dramatic Special. Andre Braugher was also nominated in the same category.
At the Black Reel Awards of 2003, Robert Townsend won the Black Reel Award for Outstanding Director, TV Movie or Limited Series and the Black Reel Award for Best Director: Television Movie/Cable, Charles S. Dutton won Best Supporting Actor in a TV Movie or Limited Series, and Andre Braugher was nominated Best Actor in a TV Movie or Limited Series and won Best Actor: T.V. Movie/Cable.

External links

References

2002 films
2002 biographical drama films
2002 television films
American historical films
African-American drama films
Biographical films about activists
Films about the labor movement
Films about the working class
Brotherhood of Sleeping Car Porters
Films about race and ethnicity
Films about racism
Films directed by Robert Townsend
Films scored by Stephen James Taylor
Films set in the 1920s
Films shot in Toronto
American drama television films
2000s American films